Kilmarnock South  is one of the nine electoral wards of East Ayrshire Council. Created in 2007, the ward elects three councillors using the single transferable vote electoral system and covers an area with a population of 10,866 people.

The area is a Scottish National Party (SNP) stronghold with the party holding two of the three seats at every election.

Boundaries
The ward was created following the Fourth Statutory Reviews of Electoral Arrangements ahead of the 2007 Scottish local elections. As a result of the Local Governance (Scotland) Act 2004, local elections in Scotland would use the single transferable vote electoral system from 2007 onwards so Kilmarnock South was formed from an amalgamation of several previous first-past-the-post wards. It contains all of the former Shortlees and Bellfield wards as well as most of the former Riccarton ward. The only minor alteration to the previous ward boundaries was along the former Riccarton boundary which was brought south to run along the A71 rather than along the River Irvine to the north of the road. Kilmarnock South includes the southernmost part of Kilmarnock including the neighbourhoods of Shortlees, Bellfield and Riccarton as well as an area between Kilmarnock and the council's boundary with South Ayrshire. Following the Fifth Statutory Reviews of Electoral Arrangements ahead of the 2017 Scottish local elections, the ward's boundaries were not changed.

Councillors

Election results

2022 election

2017 election

2012 election

2007 election

References

Wards of East Ayrshire
Politics of Kilmarnock